Beaver Lake is located west of Moshier Falls, New York. Fish species present in the lake are pickerel, yellow perch, white sucker, and black bullhead. There is carry down trail access from the Reliant Energy/NYSDEC parking lot.

References

Lakes of New York (state)
Lakes of Lewis County, New York